Masculine  or masculinity, normally refer to qualities positively associated with men. 

Masculine may also refer to:
Masculine (grammar), a grammatical gender
Masculine cadence, a final chord occurring on a strong beat in music
Masculine rhyme, on a single stressed syllable at the end of a line of poetry

See also
Male (disambiguation)
Female (disambiguation)
Feminine (disambiguation)